The Bennett–Williams House is a historic house, located in The Dalles, Oregon, United States. It is listed on the National Register of Historic Places, and is also listed as a contributing resource in the National Register-listed Trevitt's Addition Historic District.

Built circa 1899 for prominent local lawyer, judge, and Oregon Supreme Court justice Alfred S. Bennett, the house is the most outstanding and best preserved example of Queen Anne architecture in The Dalles. It later became the home of leading members of the Williams family, a notable local merchant family.

See also
National Register of Historic Places listings in Wasco County, Oregon
Hugh Glenn House
Joseph D. and Margaret Kelly House

References

Houses in The Dalles, Oregon
Houses on the National Register of Historic Places in Oregon
Queen Anne architecture in Oregon
National Register of Historic Places in Wasco County, Oregon
Houses completed in 1899
1899 establishments in Oregon
Individually listed contributing properties to historic districts on the National Register in Oregon